XHTP-FM 95.5 is a radio station in Banderilla, Veracruz. It is known as Sensación and carries a pop format.

XHTP is the first HD Radio station in Veracruz; it received authorization to broadcast in HD Radio in 2012 and at the time promoted itself as the first HD Radio station in Mexico. It broadcasts only one subchannel.

History
The concession for 1380 AM was awarded in 1977. The original transmitter was located at Noalinco. The FM station was added in 1994.

On October 28, 2019, XHTP presented the IFT with the surrender of its AM frequency, operating at 10,000 watts day and 1,000 watts night.

References

Radio stations in Veracruz
Radio stations established in 1977